Queen of Blood (also known as Planet of Blood) is a 1966 science fiction horror film produced by George Edwards and Samuel Z. Arkoff, directed by Curtis Harrington, that stars John Saxon, Basil Rathbone, Dennis Hopper, and Judi Meredith. The film is based on the screenplay for the earlier Soviet feature film Mechte Navstrechu (A Dream Come True). Director Harrington also reused special effects footage from that film, as well as footage from the Soviet science fiction film Nebo Zovyot (Battle Beyond the Sun).

Queen of Blood was released by American International Pictures as a double feature with Blood Bath. Director Curtis Harrington felt that Ridley Scott's Alien (1979) must have received some inspiration from his earlier feature, saying "Ridley's film is like a greatly enhanced, expensive and elaborate version of Queen of Blood".

An alien species contacts Earth saying that they are journeying across the galaxy to make formal contact with humanity. Their interstellar starship crashes on Mars and an Earthship is dispatched to attempt a rescue. On Mars, they locate the downed spacecraft, but only a single dead alien humanoid is found aboard. They determine that an alien rescue shuttle left the Red Planet but crashed on nearby Phobos. A strange, green-skinned woman is found alive aboard the shuttle's wreck. As they head back to Earth, the crew begins to die, drained of their blood.

Plot
The year is 1990. Space travel is well-established since humans first landed on the Moon twenty years earlier. At the International Institute of Space Technology, communications expert and astronaut Laura James monitors strange signals being received from outer space. Laura's superior, Dr. Farraday, translates the signal and discovers that it is from an alien race, who are sending an ambassador to Earth. Soon after, however, Laura receives a video log showing that the aliens' starship has crash-landed on Mars.

The Institute launches a rescue mission aboard the spaceship Oceano, which includes Laura and astronauts Anders Brockman and Paul Grant. Oceano travels through a sunburst, suffering some damage, before completing the journey to Mars and locating the downed alien craft. Anders and Paul investigate and discover a single dead alien aboard. Faraday deduces that the surviving crew may have been rescued, so an observation satellite will be needed to locate the alien rescue ship. Laura's fiancé Allan and fellow astronaut Tony volunteer. They travel on the spaceship Meteor to Phobos, one of the two moons of Mars, where they launch the observation satellite. Tony finds an alien spaceship on Phobos. He and Allan are able to enter, finding an unconscious but still-living female alien. As their rescue ship holds only two, one of them must stay behind, so they toss a coin and Tony stays.

Allan and the female alien arrive on Oceano, joining Laura, Paul and Anders. The alien regains consciousness and smiles at the three men, but not Laura. The alien refuses to eat all food offered and will not let Anders take a blood sample. That night, as Paul is guarding the alien, she attacks and kills him, draining his blood after first hypnotizing him. The surviving astronauts decide to keep her alive by feeding her blood from the ship's plasma supply. When this supply runs out, she kills Anders and feeds on him, leaving Laura and Allan the only humans aboard.

The alien then attacks Allan, but Laura interrupts her before she can kill again. Laura scratches her in the struggle, and the alien screams in terror, quickly bleeding to death. Laura and Allen then find alien eggs hidden aboard. Allan hypothesizes that she was royalty, likely a queen (assuming human-like inbreeding among royalty, hence her hemophilia), and was being sent to Earth in order to breed. Their spaceship lands safely, but Earth authorities decide to study the alien eggs rather than destroying them outright, as Allan has urged.

Cast

 John Saxon as Allan Brenner
 Basil Rathbone as Dr. Farraday
 Judi Meredith as Laura James
 Dennis Hopper as Paul Grant
 Florence Marly as Alien Queen
 Robert Boon as Anders Brockman
 Don Eitner as Tony Barrata
 Forrest J. Ackerman as Farraday's aide

Production

Development
Harrington had made his name with the feature Night Tide, which impressed Roger Corman enough to offer the director a film project. "Of course, I would like to do a more individual film than Queen of Blood", said Harrington at the time, "but I can't get the financing. However, the film is entertaining, and I feel I was able to say something within the context of the genre".

Queen of Blood was made using special effects from the Soviet films Mechte Navstrechu (A Dream Come True) and Nebo Zovyot (Battle Beyond the Sun). Harrington made Queen of Blood back-to-back with Voyage to the Prehistoric Planet, which also incorporated footage from the Soviet films. Both Harrington films starred Basil Rathbone.

Harrington says Corman "wanted me to write a completely new framing story to use all the technical footage of a rocket flying through outer space, landing on another planet and all that. I then proceeded to write a script and created the idea of an outer space vampire-like creature.” Harrington estimated that 70% of the film was his; many years later he said it was 90%.

Harrington hired George Edwards to act as line producer. The director met Edwards when the latter produced a stage production of Tennessee Williams' The Garden District. They collaborated well together and would go on to have a long professional relationship.

Corman's name does not appear on the final film. Harrington says this is because Queen of Blood was made with a non-union crew, and Corman had signed a contract to work with the unions.

Harrington says A Dream Come True was about a queen from another planet. He wanted to do a film about a vampire in outer space and had to make her female to match the Russian footage.

Czech actor Florence Marly was a personal friend of Harrington. He later said that he had to fight with Roger Corman in order to hire her "because she was an older woman. I'm sure he had some bimbo in mind, you know? So I fought for Marley because I felt she had the required exotic quality that would work in the role." Harrington also said Dennis Hopper "was like a part of my little team by then", so he also agreed to appear.

Shooting
The film was shot at Major Studios in downtown Los Angeles, shortly before they were bought by Robert Aldrich.

John Saxon later claimed that Gene Corman had more to do with Queen of Blood than Roger. Saxon estimated that his scenes were shot in seven to eight days and that Dennis Hopper "was trying very hard to keep a straight face throughout" during the making of the film. He added in another interview, "I took it seriously, at least while on camera; Dennis had a hard time doing even that."

Harrington said the film was shot in six days. He was able to do this because the shoot was non-union and meant the crew would work long hours, sometimes until two in the morning.

"Basil Rathbone had one day (on the set)", added Saxon. "He came on and he was a very, very distinguished gentleman. He did his scene. But he got annoyed, because they didn't get the sound right on his first take, and they asked him to come back. He dressed down the director."

Basil Rathbone was paid $1,500 to act for a day and a half on Queen of Blood, and $1,500 for half a day on Voyage to the Prehistoric Planet (1965), another film that incorporated Russian film footage.

Rathbone ended up working overtime and missed a meal. The Screen Actors Guild demanded overtime pay, plus a fine for the meal violation, but producer George Edwards produced footage that showed the delay was because Rathbone had not memorized all his lines and insisted on skipping lunch. Harrington recalled Rathbone as "a great pro who regaled me of stories of Hollywood in the few minutes here and there between set ups."

Harrington says the sets were not ready on the first day of filming because "Roger had hired a bunch of hippies as set decorators and they were stoned all the time".

In the film the space vampire paralyzes her victims with her glowing eyes, and late in the film she appears to direct a kind of "heat vision" from her eyes to burn through a rope that has been used to confine her. The effect of the vampire's glowing eyes was one of the most striking elements of the film; Harrington told an interviewer that they achieved the effect on set by directing pencil-thin beams of light into Florence Marly's eyes.

According to one account, the budget for this and Voyage to the Prehistoric Planet came to $33,052. Another said the films cost $65,000. Harrington has said they cost $60,000, then $50,000, though he admits to not being sure.

Release
Queen of Blood was released in the United States in March 1966. Even before the release, its quality was sufficient for Universal to hire Harrington and producer George Edwards to make the feature film Games.

A novelization of Harrington’s original screenplay was written by pulp writer Charles Nuetzel. The biography about Forrest J. Ackerman erroneously suggests that Harrington based his original screenplay on a book by Nuetzel. The novel is back in print as an ebook available online. 

On December 1, 2003, Queen of Blood was featured at the Sitges Film Festival in Spain.

Reception
In her review of a double bill with the feature Three in the Attic, Renata Adler of The New York Times called Queen of Blood the livelier of the two films.

Sequel
Alien queen actor Florence Marly made a 16 mm sequel to Queen of Blood titled Space Boy! Night, Neal and Ness in 1973.

See also
List of American films of 1966

References

External links
 Queen of Blood  at MGM Home Entertainment
 
Queen of Blood at TCMDB
 
 

1966 films
1966 horror films
1960s science fiction horror films
1960s monster movies
American science fiction horror films
American independent films
1960s English-language films
American monster movies
American vampire films
American International Pictures films
Films about astronauts
Films directed by Curtis Harrington
Films set in 1990
Films set in the future
Mars in film
Films shot in Los Angeles
1960s American films